This is a list of census-designated places in the U.S. state of Virginia

Census-designated places in Virginia

References